Pellinaati Pramanalu is a 1958 Indian Telugu-language comedy drama film, produced and directed by K. V. Reddy. It stars Akkineni Nageswara Rao and Jamuna, with music composed by Ghantasala. The film was simultaneously made in Tamil as Vaazhkai Oppandham with a slightly different cast that released the following year.

The Telugu version was released on 12 December 1958 and the Tamil film on 4 September 1959. The Telugu version had an above average run at the box-office while the Tamil film fared average but recovered its money through pre-selling. At the 6th National Film Awards, Pellinaati Pramanalu won the Best Feature Film in Telugu award.

Plot 
Bheemasena Rao is a dignified and respectful man, he has a son, Captain Pratap who works in Military services, and a daughter, Rukmini. Salahala Rao, the close friend and relative to Bheemasena Rao is trying to arrange a marriage to Rukmini.

Krishna Rao is a distant relative of Salahala Rao. He was sent to meet Bheemasena Rao with a recommendation letter where they mistake him for a cook. After a few comic incidents, Krishna Rao and Rukmini fall in love. In the beginning, Bheemasena Rao is not willing to do it because of Krishna Rao's status.

Meanwhile, Pratap arrives, he explains to his father that Krishna Rao is his close friend and a very nice guy. So, finally, they make the marriage arrangements which are performed in a social form when a political leader takes marriage vows from them that they should not cheat each other. Krishna Rao starts a new family in the town and finds a job in Salahala Rao's company Andalu-Alankaralu owned by R. P. Nanda. During the next seven years, they are blessed with three children.

But after that Rukmini becomes busy with household responsibilities. Krishna Rao becomes fed up with her behaviour. Subsequently, he is attracted to his secretary Radha. He even goes to her house during the absence of his wife. After knowing about the affair, Pratap and Salahala Rao play a drama with the help of Radha and let Krishna Rao realise his mistake. The film ends with the marriage of Pratap and Radha.

Cast 
Akkineni Nageswara Rao as Krishna Rao
Jamuna as Rukmini
S. V. Ranga Rao as Rao Bahadur Bheemasena Rao
Rajasulochana as Radha Devi
R. Nageswara Rao as Pratap
Ramana Reddy as Salahala Rao
Chhaya Devi as Salahala Rao's wife Anuradhamma
Dr. Sivaramakrishnayya as R. P. Nanda
Peketi Sivaram as M. V. Hal
Allu Ramalingaiah as Prakatanalu
Chadalavada as Ammakalu
Balakrishna as Office Peon
Surabhi Kamalabai as Yerukala Subbi

Production 
K. V. Reddy liked the American film The Seven Year Itch (1955) and its story idea and wanted to make a film on the same theme. Earlier, K. V. Reddy wanted to make this film for Annapurna Pictures' maiden production but was vetoed by producer Dukkipati Madhusudana Rao despite the fact that both K. V. Reddy and the lead actor Akkineni Nageswara Rao liked the idea. Madhusudana Rao felt that the audience may not accept their favourite hero to be shown as the father of three children in most parts of the movie and cheat his wife.

After the phenomenal success of both Donga Ramudu (1955) and Mayabazar (1957), K. V. Reddy decided to venture into film production and formed Jayanthi Pictures, with fellow alumni at the Presidency College, Madras — P. S. Reddy and T. Pattabhirama Reddy. He chose this idea for Jayanthi Pictures' first project. K. V. Reddy entrusted the job of adapting it to Telugu nativity to Pingali Nagendra Rao. Pingali took only the central point of “marital wanderlust” from the Hollywood film and came up with an entirely new story and characters.

Titled Pellilnati Pramanalu, the film starred Akkineni Nageswara Rao and Jamuna. The film was simultaneously made in Tamil as Vaazhkai Oppandham with a slightly different cast that released the following year.

Release and reception 
The Telugu version was released on 12 December 1958 and the Tamil film on 4 September 1959. The Telugu version had an above average run at the box-office while the Tamil film fared average but recovered its money through pre-selling.

Soundtrack 
Music was composed by Ghantasala. Lyrics were written by Pingali.

Accolades 
At the 6th National Film Awards, Pellinaati Pramanalu won the award for Best Feature Film in Telugu.

References

External links 
 

1950s feminist films
1950s Telugu-language films
1958 comedy-drama films
1958 films
Best Telugu Feature Film National Film Award winners
Films about Indian weddings
Films about women in India
Films directed by K. V. Reddy
Films scored by Ghantasala (musician)
Indian black-and-white films
Indian comedy-drama films
Indian feminist films
Social realism in film
Telugu films remade in other languages